Pinkas Braun (7 January 1923 – 24 June 2008) was a Swiss film actor. He appeared in 70 films between 1952 and 2002. He was born in Zürich, Switzerland and died in Munich, Germany.

Partial filmography

 Sky Without Stars (1955) - Kommissar Engelbrecht
 Wir Wunderkinder (1958) - Siegfried Stein
 The Miracle of Father Malachia (1961) - Christian Krüger
 The Puzzle of the Red Orchid (1962) - Edwin
 The Door with Seven Locks (1962) - Dr. Antonio Staletti
The Curse of the Yellow Snake (1963) - Fing-Su / St. Clay
 The Lightship (1963) - Funker Philippi
 Piccadilly Zero Hour 12 (1963) - Sir Reginald Cunningham
 Waiting Room to the Beyond (1964) - Felix
 Dog Eat Dog (1964) - Livio Morelli
  (1964) - Roger Marton, Antiquitätenhändler
 Black Eagle of Santa Fe (1965) - Gentleman
 City of Fear (1965) - Ferenc
 St. Pauli Herbertstraße (1965) - Werner Kästel
 Secret Agent Super Dragon (1966) - (uncredited)
 The Hunchback of Soho (1966) - Alan Davis
 Clint the Stranger (1967) - Don Shannon
 Mission Stardust (1967) - Arkin
 The Man Outside (1967) - Rafe Machek
  (1967, TV Mini-Series) - John Evans
 Im Banne des Unheimlichen (1968) - The Stranger
  (1969, TV Movie) - Deval
 The Last Escape (1970) - Von Heinken
   (1971, TV Mini-Series) - Sir Percival Glyde
 Derrick (1976-1986, TV Series) - Dr. Kroll / Dr. Bergmann
 Jeder stirbt für sich allein (1976) - Widerstandskämpfer Der Dunkle
 Bloodline (1979) - Dr. Wal
 Charlie Muffin (1979, TV Movie) - Valery Kalenin
 L'ombre rouge (1981) - Maly
 All Fired Up (1982) - Monsieur Nash
 The Tiger Brigades (1982-1983, TV Series) - Gabrielli
  (1984) - Col. Debars
 Falosny princ (1985) - Hlavný vezír
 Anna Göldin, letzte Hexe (1991) - Pfarrer Camerarius
 Die Zeit danach (1992)
  (1993) - Hormann
 K (1997) - Joseph Katz / Karl Heinrich
 Komiker (2000) - Max
 Verzauberte Emma oder Hilfe, ich bin ein Junge... ! (2002) - Albert Tartov

References

External links

1923 births
2008 deaths
Swiss male film actors
Swiss male television actors
20th-century Swiss male actors
21st-century Swiss male actors
Swiss Jews
Male actors from Zürich